Tarmo Kõuts (born 27 November 1953) is an Estonian politician and former Commander of the Estonian Defence Forces.

Kõuts graduated from Tallinn Maritime School in 1973 and from Kaliningrad Technical Institute in 1985. From 1973 to 1990 he worked in various positions in the Estonian Shipping Company. He served as the rector of Estonian Maritime Academy from 1990 to 1993 and as the director-general of Estonian Border Guard from 1993 to 2000.

In September 2000 Rear Admiral Kõuts was appointed commander of the Estonian Defence Forces. Having been promoted to the rank of vice admiral in 2002, Kõuts retained the position until 2006, when he stepped down to move into politics. He joined the right-wing Union of Pro Patria and Res Publica and successfully ran for a seat in the parliament in the 2007 elections.

Effective dates of promotion

Estonian Army
See Military ranks of Estonia

References

Tarmo Kõuts. Parliament of Estonia
Vice Admiral Tarmo Kõuts. Multinational Corps Northeast

External links

|-

|-
 

1953 births
Living people
People from Saaremaa Parish
Isamaa politicians
Members of the Riigikogu, 2007–2011
Estonian admirals
Recipients of the Order of the National Coat of Arms, 2nd Class
21st-century Estonian politicians